Frank Thompson (born Augustus Fernandez; February 1852 – October 30, 1925) was a Portuguese professional baseball player who played outfield for the Brooklyn Atlantics and catcher for the Washington Nationals in 1875.

Thompson played in 11 games with the 1875 Washington Nationals, during which he had a batting average of .098 and committed 32 errors and 25 passed balls.

In his lone game with the 1875 Brooklyn Atlantics, Thompson recorded two hits, a run scored, and a run batted in, but made two errors in two chances while playing right field.

In 1877, Thompson played for Erie of the League Alliance.

In 2018, researchers determined that Frank Thompson, of the Atlantics, and a player previously identified as either Andrew Thompson or only by the surname "Thompson", of the Nationals, were actually the same player, who had been born in Madeira as "Augustus Fernandez." He is the first Major League Baseball player known to have been born in Portugal, and the only one born there to date.

While David Nemec identifies this player as the Andrew Thompson who managed the St. Paul Saints of the Union Association in 1884, Paul Batesel states that they were two different people.

References

External links

Brooklyn Atlantics players
19th-century baseball players
Major League Baseball catchers
1852 births
1925 deaths
Washington Nationals (NA) players
Madeiran sportspeople
Burials at Holy Cross Cemetery, Brooklyn